Robert Samuel Elliott (born 20 July 1950) is a Hong Kong épée, foil and sabre fencer. He competed in the three individual events at the 1972 Summer Olympics.

References

1950 births
Living people
Hong Kong male épée fencers
Olympic fencers of Hong Kong
Fencers at the 1972 Summer Olympics
Hong Kong male foil fencers
Hong Kong male sabre fencers
20th-century Hong Kong people